Dance in the City is a painting by French artist Pierre-Auguste Renoir. The 1883 work is in the collection of the Musée d'Orsay. The dancers are model and artist Suzanne Valadon and Renoir's friend Paul Auguste Lhôte.

This work, along with companion pieces Dance in the Country and Dance at Bougival, was produced to order for the art dealer Paul Durand-Ruel. All three were painted in 1883 featuring two people dancing in different environments (although the woman in Dance in the Country was modelled by Aline Charigot, later Renoir's wife).

References

1883 paintings
Paintings by Pierre-Auguste Renoir
Paintings in the collection of the Musée d'Orsay
Dance in art
Suzanne Valadon